The first siege of Takatenjin occurred in 1574, when it was attacked by the forces of Takeda Katsuyori. The garrison was commanded by Ogasawara Nagatada, who held the fortress for Tokugawa Ieyasu. 

Nagatada surrendered to the Takeda clan, and became a Takeda retainer, receiving the Omosu District of Suruga Province as a fief, where he would remain relatively neutral until the Invasion of Kai Province during 1582.

See also
Siege of Takatenjin (1581)

References

Takatenjin 1574
Takatenjin 1574
1574 in Japan
Conflicts in 1574